Asterolamia cingulata is a species of sea snail, a marine gastropod mollusk in the family Eulimidae. The species is one of two known species within the genus Asterolamia, the other being Asterolamia hians.

References

External links
 To World Register of Marine Species

Eulimidae
Gastropods described in 1980